Abortion in Ireland may refer to:

Abortion in the Republic of Ireland, abortion in the sovereign state of Ireland
Abortion in Northern Ireland, a constituent country of the United Kingdom